Summertime is a 2009 novel by South African-born Nobel laureate J. M. Coetzee. It is the third in a series of fictionalized memoirs by Coetzee (the first two being Boyhood and Youth) and details the life of one John Coetzee from the perspective of five people who have known him. The novel largely takes place in the mid to late 1970s, largely in Cape Town, although there are also important scenes in more remote South African settings. While there are obvious similarities between the actual writer of the novel, J. M. Coetzee, and the subject of the novel, John Coetzee, there are some differences - most notably that the John Coetzee of the novel is reported as having died. Within the novel, the opinions and thoughts of the five people are compiled and interpreted by a fictitious biographer, who also adds fragments from John Coetzee's notebooks. It was shortlisted for the 2009 Booker Prize. Coetzee was already a two-time winner of the award and it is for this reason that literary commentator Merritt Moseley believes he did not win it for Summertime.

References

2009 novels
Fiction set in the 1970s
Autobiographical novels
Novels by J. M. Coetzee
Novels set in Cape Town
21st-century South African novels